This is a list of former United States counties, a list of United States counties (administrative subunits of a U.S. state) that no longer exist. 

They were established by a state, provincial, colonial, or territorial government.  Most of these counties were created and disbanded in the 19th century; county boundaries have changed little since 1900 in the vast majority of states. A county is repeated on the list if its jurisdiction changed from one state, colony, or territory to another.

This list includes (but is not limited to) counties that were renamed but retained their territorial integrity, or counties that were transferred wholesale to another state when it was separated from another state (Massachusetts counties transferred to Maine; Virginia counties transferred to Kentucky and West Virginia; and North Carolina counties transferred to Tennessee).

Alabama
 Baine County, Alabama (1866–1867, reestablished as Etowah County a year later)
 Baker County, Alabama (1868–1874, renamed Chilton County)
 Benton County, Alabama (1832–1858, named for Thomas Hart Benton, Creek War officer and U.S. Senator, renamed Calhoun County in 1858 for John C. Calhoun)
 Cahawba County, Alabama (1818–1820, renamed Bibb County)
 Cotaco County, Alabama (1818–1821, renamed Morgan County)
 Decatur County, Alabama (1821–1825, land redistributed between Madison and Jackson counties)
 Hancock County, Alabama (1850–1858, renamed Winston County)
 Jones County, Alabama (Feb–Nov 1867, area was reestablished in Oct 1868 as Sanford County and then renamed Lamar County in 1877)
 Jones County, Alabama (Aug–Oct 1868, Covington County was briefly renamed Jones County then changed back)
 Sanford County, Alabama (1868–1877, renamed Lamar County)

Alaska
Alaska has never created counties.  Under Section 9 of the 1912 organic act creating the Territory of Alaska, Alaska was prohibited from establishing counties without explicit approval from the U.S. Congress.  The framers of the Constitution of Alaska chose to forgo consideration of a county system in favor of a system of boroughs, both organized and unorganized.  In 1961, the Alaska Legislature formalized the borough structure to encompass multiple, separate organized boroughs and a single unorganized borough.  Alaska currently has 18 organized boroughs.  The United States Census Bureau, beginning with the 1970 United States Census, divided the Unorganized Borough into census areas.  The boundaries of these census areas were largely based upon the early election districts of the state, which in turn were largely based upon the recording districts of the territory.  Following is a list of former boroughs in Alaska:

Chugiak–Eagle River Borough (1974–1975, incorporation invalidated by the Alaska Supreme Court)
 Greater Anchorage Area Borough (1964–1975, succeeded by Municipality of Anchorage)
 Greater Juneau Borough (1963–1970, succeeded by City and Borough of Juneau)
 Greater Sitka Borough (1963–1971, succeeded by City and Borough of Sitka)
 The Haines Borough was incorporated in 1968 as a third-class borough.  Through consolidation, this municipality was dissolved, along with the City of Haines, in 2002.  A home rule borough, also called the Haines Borough, was incorporated in the place of these two municipalities.
 Skagway-Hoonah-Angoon Census Area (1992–2007), renamed Hoonah-Angoon Census Area after Skagway incorporated as a city-borough.
 Skagway-Yakutat-Angoon Census Area (1980–1992), renamed Skagway-Hoonah-Angoon Census Area after Yakutat incorporated as a city-borough.
 Valdez-Cordova Census Area (1980–2019), split in 2019 into Chugach Census Area and Copper River Census Area.
 Wade Hampton Census Area (1980–2015), renamed to Kusilvak Census Area.

Arizona
 Pah-Ute County, Arizona Territory (1865–1871) majority of the county transferred to Nevada in 1866, the remainder transferred to Mohave County

Arkansas
 Clayton County, Arkansas (1873–1875, renamed Clay County)
 Dorsey County, Arkansas (1873–1885, renamed Cleveland County)
 Lovely County, Arkansas Territory (1827–1828) most of the county was lost to Oklahoma due to the Cherokee Treaty of 1828, the remainder became Washington County
 Miller County, Arkansas Territory (1820–1838, became part of Indian Territory and present-day Texas)
 Sarber County, Arkansas (1871–1875, renamed Logan County)

California
 Branciforte County - renamed to Santa Cruz County in 1850 after less than a year of existence.
 Buena Vista County – created in 1855 by the California legislature out of the southeastern territory of Tulare County on the west of the Sierra Nevada but was never officially organized. Some of that region was later organized as Kern County in 1866, with additions from Los Angeles and San Bernardino counties.
 Coso County – created in 1864 by the California legislature out of territory of Tulare County on the east slope of the Sierra Nevada but was never officially organized. The region was later organized in 1866 as Inyo County with additions from Los Angeles and San Bernardino counties. 
 Klamath County – created in 1851 from the northern half of Trinity County. In 1874 it was divided between Humboldt and Siskiyou counties.
 Pautah County – created by the California legislature in 1852 out of territory the state believed would be ceded to it east of Lake Tahoe, but which was given to Nevada. The county was never officially organized.

Colorado

Colorado Territory was formed from the lands of four organized territories: Kansas to the southeast, New Mexico to the south, Utah to the west, and Nebraska to the northeast. Before Colorado Territory was organized, all of these except Nebraska had declared county boundaries that included part of modern-day Colorado.

Counties formed by New Mexico Territory
Taos County, New Mexico Territory was originally one of the seven partidos of the Spanish, and later Mexican, province of Nuevo México. One of the nine original counties created by the U.S. Territory of New Mexico on January 29, 1852; ceased to have jurisdiction over Colorado in 1861.
Mora County, New Mexico Territory was split from Taos County and San Miguel County on February 1, 1860, and ceased to have jurisdiction over Colorado in 1861.

Counties formed by Utah Territory
On March 3, 1852, the following counties were organized by Utah Territory, with boundaries reaching into what is now western Colorado:
Great Salt Lake County
Iron County
Sanpete County
Utah County
Washington County
Upon the organization of Colorado Territory in 1861, which became law on February 28, these counties ceased to have jurisdiction in Colorado.

Green River County was also created on March 3, 1852, but never organized; it was dissolved in 1857 and recreated in 1859. After losing land to Colorado Territory in 1861 and Wyoming Territory in 1868, Green River County was finally dissolved in 1872.

Beaver County was formed on January 5, 1856 from parts of Iron and Millard counties, and like other Utah counties, ceased to have jurisdiction in Colorado.

Counties created by Kansas Territory
Kansas Territory's western reaches encompassed the mining centers of Aurora and Pike's Peak. Beginning with the massive Arapahoe County, Kansas Territory provided for a number of counties in what would become Colorado, but organized none of them before achieving statehood in 1861.

Arapahoe County was proclaimed August 25, 1855 but never organized; it reverted to unorganized territory when Kansas joined the Union on January 29, 1861. On February 7, 1859, several counties were split from Arapahoe County; none of them were organized, and also reverted to unorganized territory when Kansas became a state. They were:
Broderick County
El Paso County
Fremont County
Montana County
Oro County

Peketon County was created on the same day in 1859, but never organized.  Like Arapahoe and its daughter counties, it reverted to unorganized territory upon Kansas achieving statehood.

Note on Nebraska Territory
No counties were organized in Nebraska Territory's portion of the future Colorado Territory.

Counties created by the Provisional Territory of Jefferson
On November 28, 1859, the Provisional General Assembly of the extralegal Territory of Jefferson established 12 counties:

Arrappahoe County
Cheyenne County
El Paso County
Fountain County
Heele County
Jackson County
Jefferson County
Montana County
North County
Park County
Saratoga County
St. Vrains County

Although it was never officially recognized by the federal government embroiled in the debate over slavery, the provisional government of the Territory of Jefferson held effective control of what became Colorado for a year and a half. Although the act establishing the Colorado Territory became law on February 28, 1861, the first Federal governor, William Gilpin, did not arrive in Denver until late May, and  the Jefferson government disbanded itself on June 6, 1861. In November 1861, Colorado's territorial legislature would establish counties of its own, with many boundaries following those of the Jefferson counties.

Counties created by the Territory of Colorado
Guadalupe County, Colorado Territory (November 1–7, 1861), was one of the 17 original counties created by the Territory of Colorado.  The county was renamed Conejos County after only six days.
Greenwood County, Colorado Territory (February 11, 1870 to February 6, 1874), was created from former Cheyenne and Arapaho tribal land and the eastern portion of Huerfano County.  The county was abolished four years later, and its territory split between Elbert County and Bent County.
Platte County, Colorado Territory (February 9, 1872 to February 9, 1874), was created from the eastern portion of Weld County.  The county was abolished two years later after organizers failed to secure voter approval, and the territory of the county was returned to Weld County.

Counties created by the State of Colorado
Carbonate County, Colorado (February 8–10, 1879).  Lake County was renamed Carbonate County in 1879.  Only two days later, Carbonate County was split into the new Chaffee County and a reestablished Lake County.
Uncompaghre County, Colorado (February 27 to March 2, 1883).  Ouray County was renamed Uncompaghre County for only four days in 1883.
South Arapahoe County, Colorado (November 15, 1902, to April 11, 1903), was one of three counties created from Arapahoe County in 1902.  The name was changed back to Arapahoe County after five months.

Connecticut
 Westmoreland County, Connecticut (see Pennamite–Yankee War and State of Westmoreland)

Delaware

Kent County, Delaware was formerly known as St. Jones County.
Sussex County, Delaware was formerly known as Deale County.

District of Columbia
 
The United States Census Bureau and the Office of Management and Budget currently consider the District of Columbia to consist of a single county equivalent. Otherwise the District of Columbia currently has no counties or county equivalents. The former counties of the District of Columbia are:
 Alexandria County, D.C. (1791–1846) retroceded to Virginia becoming Alexandria County, Virginia.
 Washington County, D.C. Abolished in 1871 and consolidated with the District of Columbia. Under the current (2001, revised through 2005) District of Columbia Code, the entire District of Columbia is a single body corporate for district purposes; the code does not mention Washington County except to make the District of Columbia the successor in title to its property.

Georgetown City and Washington City are former county equivalents. The District of Columbia comprised three county equivalents when it was consolidated in 1871: Georgetown City, Washington City, and the Remainder of the District—as they are termed in the Ninth Census of the United States (1870). There had been four county equivalents in the District prior to the retrocession of Alexandria to Virginia in 1846. In its retrospective decennial population counts the Ninth Census lists four for 1840 back to 1810, Alexandria and Washington counties alone for 1800, and none for 1790 prior to the creation of the district.

Florida
 Benton County, Florida, named for Missouri Senator Thomas Hart Benton in 1844, renamed Hernando County in 1850
 Fayette County, Florida became parts of Jackson, Calhoun and Gulf counties in 1833
 Mosquito County, Florida renamed Orange County, Florida in 1845.
 New River County, Florida renamed Bradford County, Florida in 1861.

Georgia
 Bourbon County, Georgia (organized by Georgia in 1785 out of disputed Yazoo lands in present-day Mississippi; dissolved in 1788)
 Campbell County, Georgia (1828–1931); merged with Fulton County
 Cass County, Georgia (1832–1861); renamed Bartow County
 Kinchafoonee County, Georgia (1853–1856); renamed Webster County
 Milton County, Georgia (1857–1931); merged with Fulton County
 Walton County (1803–1818); merged with Buncombe County, North Carolina

Idaho
 Alturas County, Idaho (1864–1895) reduced greatly in size at creation of Elmore County and Logan County in 1889.  In 1891, an attempt was made to transfer to Alta County, declared unconstitutional.  Transferred to Blaine County in 1895  
 Lah-Toh County, Idaho Territory (1864–1867) absorbed by Nez Perce and Kootenai County.
 Logan County, Idaho (1889–1895) In 1891, an attempt was made to transfer territory to Lincoln County and Alta County.  Act declared unconstitutional.  In 1895, the Idaho Legislature combined Logan and Alturas Counties into a new county called Blaine
 Alta County created from Alturas in 1891, Act declared unconstitutional in May, 1891.

Illinois

Revolutionary era
 Illinois County, Virginia, formed in 1778 to govern Virginia's claims to present-day Illinois, Indiana, Michigan, Ohio, Wisconsin and eastern Minnesota; county abolished 5 January 1782; territory ceded by Virginia to Congress in March 1784. Its effective reach was limited to the French settlements at Cahokia, Kaskaskia, and Vincennes.

Former counties of the Northwest and Indiana territories
Before Illinois Territory was created in 1809, it was part of the Northwest Territory from 1788 to 1800, and Indiana Territory from 1800 to 1809. At first, two counties of the Northwest Territory were created to govern what became the modern state of Illinois, followed by two others:
 St. Clair County, Northwest Territory established April 27, 1790, later St. Clair County, Indiana Territory; upon the organization of Indiana Territory in 1800, St. Clair County was enlarged to take in present-day Wisconsin, eastern Minnesota, and the western portion of Michigan's Upper Peninsula. When Illinois Territory was set off from the Indiana Territory in 1809, St. Clair County was included in the new government.
 Knox County, Northwest Territory, established June 20, 1790, later Knox County, Indiana Territory, 1800; its boundaries in 1795 included the eastern half of the future state of Illinois. Portions of Knox County would be transferred to Michigan Territory upon its organization in 1805 and to Illinois Territory upon its organization in 1809; the remainder was included in the state of Indiana upon its achieving statehood in 1816.
 Randolph County, Northwest Territory, proclaimed 1795, from part of St. Clair County; transferred to Indiana Territory in 1800 and Illinois Territory in 1809, now Randolph County, Illinois.
 Wayne County, Northwest Territory, proclaimed on August 15, 1796 following the British evacuation of Detroit; out of portions of Hamilton County, Northwest Territory and unorganized land, mostly in the present-day Lower Peninsula of Michigan. This first Wayne County originally included a slice of the present Lake Michigan shoreline of Illinois, the site of present-day Chicago; its lands would be transferred to Knox County, Indiana Territory and later, the Illinois Territory. Transferred to Indiana Territory in 1803 and to Michigan Territory in 1805.

Counties organized by Illinois Territory
Other counties were organized by the Illinois Territory from the lands of St. Clair County between 1812 and 1819 and notionally included parts of the future Michigan, Minnesota, and Wisconsin territories in their boundaries:
 Madison County, Illinois Territory, 1813, from St. Clair
 Edwards County, Illinois Territory, 1815, from Madison
 Crawford County, Illinois Territory, 1816, from Edwards
 Bond County, Illinois Territory, 1817, from Madison

Before Illinois achieved statehood in 1818, the part of Illinois Territory excluded from the new state (Wisconsin, eastern Minnesota, and the western Upper Peninsula of Michigan) was transferred to Michigan Territory. No county governments were included in this transfer.

Indiana

Revolutionary era
 Illinois County, Virginia, formed in 1778 to govern Virginia's claims to present-day Illinois, Indiana, Michigan, Ohio, Wisconsin and eastern Minnesota; county abolished 5 January 1782; territory ceded by Virginia to Congress in March 1784. Its effective reach was limited to the French settlements at Cahokia, Kaskaskia, and Vincennes.

Former counties of the Northwest and Indiana territories
Indiana Territory was created in 1800, and had since 1788 been part of the Northwest Territory; the new territory included modern-day Illinois, Indiana, Wisconsin and eastern Minnesota, as well at the western Upper Peninsula of Michigan. At first, one county of the Northwest Territory had been created to govern what became the modern state of Indiana, and three others would be included in the Indiana Territory:
 Knox County, Northwest Territory, established June 20, 1790, later Knox County, Indiana Territory, 1800; its boundaries in 1795 included the eastern half of the future state of Illinois, and its 1800 boundaries included the western half of Michigan's Lower Peninsula. The northern portions of Knox County would be transferred to Michigan Territory upon its organization in 1805, and the westernmost to Illinois Territory upon its organization in 1809; the remainder was included in the state of Indiana upon its achieving statehood in 1816. The county's current form is that of Knox County, Indiana.
 St. Clair County, Northwest Territory established April 27, 1790, later St. Clair County, Indiana Territory; upon the organization of Indiana Territory in 1800, St. Clair County was included in the new territory and enlarged to take in present-day Wisconsin, eastern Minnesota, and the western portion of Michigan's Upper Peninsula. When Illinois Territory was set off from the Indiana Territory in 1809, St. Clair County was included in the new government.
 Randolph County, Northwest Territory, proclaimed 1795, from part of St. Clair County; transferred to Indiana Territory in 1800 and Illinois Territory in 1809, now Randolph County, Illinois.
 Wayne County, Northwest Territory, proclaimed on August 15, 1796 following the British evacuation of Detroit; out of portions of Hamilton County, Northwest Territory and unorganized land, mostly in the present-day Lower Peninsula of Michigan. This first Wayne County originally included a slice of northern Indiana; all of Wayne County west of the present Indiana–Ohio line was transferred to Knox County, Indiana Territory in 1800. After losing other lands to the new state of Ohio, the remaining portion of Wayne County was transferred to Indiana Territory in 1803 and to Michigan Territory in 1805. The current Wayne County, Michigan is considered a successor of the 1796 establishment.

Former districts of the Louisiana Territory
 District of Louisiana, attached to Indiana Territory October 1, 1804, pending the organization of Louisiana Territory, which took place July 4, 1805.

Former counties of the State of Indiana
 Richardville County, name changed to Howard County in 1859.
 Newton County, Indiana, Original Newton County abolished in 1839. Current County recreated in 1859 as the last county in Indiana.

Iowa

Counties of Iowa created by Michigan Territory
 Des Moines County, Michigan Territory was organized in 1834, became part of Wisconsin Territory in 1836, and is now Des Moines County, Iowa
 Dubuque County, Michigan Territory was organized in 1834, became part of Wisconsin Territory in 1836, and is now Dubuque County, Iowa

Counties of Iowa created by Wisconsin Territory
 Henry County, Wisconsin Territory, 1836; see Henry County, Iowa
 Lee County, Wisconsin Territory, 1836; see Lee County, Iowa
 Louisa County, Wisconsin Territory, 1836; see Louisa County, Iowa
 Muscatine County, Wisconsin Territory, 1836; see Muscatine County, Iowa
 Van Buren County, Wisconsin Territory, 1836; see Van Buren County, Iowa
 Henry County, Wisconsin Territory, 1836; see Henry County, Iowa
 Benton County, Wisconsin Territory, 1837; see Benton County, Iowa
 Buchanan County, Wisconsin Territory, 1837; see Buchanan County, Iowa
 Cedar County, Wisconsin Territory, 1837; see Cedar County, Iowa
 Clayton County, Wisconsin Territory, 1837; see Clayton County, Iowa
 Clinton County, Wisconsin Territory, 1837; see Clinton County, Iowa
 Delaware County, Wisconsin Territory, 1837; see Delaware County, Iowa
 Fayette County, Wisconsin Territory, 1837; see Fayette County, Iowa
 Jackson County, Wisconsin Territory, 1837; see Jackson County, Iowa
 Johnson County, Wisconsin Territory, 1837; see Johnson County, Iowa
 Jones County, Wisconsin Territory, 1837; see Jones County, Iowa
 Keokuk County, Wisconsin Territory, 1837; see Keokuk County, Iowa
 Linn County, Wisconsin Territory, 1836; see Linn County, Iowa
 Scott County, Wisconsin Territory, 1837; see Scott County, Iowa
 Slaughter County, Wisconsin Territory, 1838; see Washington County, Iowa

Former counties of the State of Iowa
 Bancroft County, Iowa was established in 1851. It was abolished in 1857 and the area was joined to Kossuth County.
 Crocker County, Iowa was created in 1870 out of Kossuth County from portions of what had been Bancroft County. It was merged back into Kossuth County in 1871.
 Wahkaw County, Iowa was established on January 15, 1851; on January 12, 1853, its name was changed to Woodbury County.

Kansas

Counties created by Kansas Territory
Several counties were created by the government of Kansas Territory in its western reaches, which included the mining districts of Auraria and Pike's Peak. None were ever organized, and all reverted to unorganized territory when Kansas achieved statehood in 1861. See also the Colorado section, above.

Arapahoe County, Kansas Territory, covered all of western Kansas Territory when it was proclaimed on August 25, 1855. On February 7, 1859, the following counties were created from parts of Arapahoe County:
Broderick County, Kansas Territory
El Paso County, Kansas Territory
Fremont County, Kansas Territory
Montana County, Kansas Territory
Oro County, Kansas Territory
Peketon County, Kansas Territory was created on the same day that these counties were split off from Arapaho; like them, it was never organized and reverted to unorganized territory in 1861.
Seward County, Kansas Territory; named Godfrey until 1861. Dissolved in 1867.
Hunter County, Kansas Territory

Counties created by the State of Kansas
Garfield County, Kansas, now a part of Finney County
Howard County, Kansas (1875)
Otoe County, Kansas
Sequoyah County, Kansas, now part of Finney County
Kansas County, Kansas, now part of Seward County
Buffalo County, Kansas
Madison County, Kansas, now part of Lyon and Greenwood Counties
Irving County, Kansas

Kentucky
Because Kentucky began as a political dependency of Virginia, its earliest counties were organized by that government.
See also Virginia & Virginia Colony, below

Historic counties created by Virginia
 Fincastle County, Virginia, proclaimed 1772, divided in 1776 into Montgomery, Washington, and Kentucky counties.
 Kentucky County, Virginia had boundaries much the same as today's Commonwealth of Kentucky.

Modern counties created by Virginia
In 1780, Kentucky County was divided by the Virginia government into three counties:
 Fayette County, Kentucky
 Jefferson County, Kentucky
 Lincoln County, Kentucky

Between 1784 and 1788, six more counties would be created in Kentucky by the Virginia authorities:
 Nelson County, Kentucky in 1784, from part of Jefferson County
 Bourbon County, Kentucky in 1785, from part of Fayette County
 Madison County, Kentucky in 1785, from part of Lincoln County
 Mercer County, Kentucky in 1785, from part of Lincoln County
 Mason County, Kentucky in 1788, from part of Bourbon County
 Woodford County, Kentucky in 1788, from part of Fayette County

These nine counties gained statehood in 1792 as the Commonwealth of Kentucky.

Former counties created by the Commonwealth of Kentucky
 Beckham County, Kentucky (1904) was dissolved by the Kentucky Court of Appeals on April 29, 1904, because it was not created in conformance with state law
(Josh Bell County, Kentucky (1867–1873), originally named for Joshua Fry Bell, was called simply Bell County beginning in 1873.)

Louisiana
The Territory of Orleans was divided into 12 counties on 10 Apr 1805; these were reorganized into parishes on 31 Mar 1807:
Acadia County, Orleans Territory
Attakapas County, Orleans Territory
Concordia County, Orleans Territory
German Coast, Orleans Territory
Iberville County, Orleans Territory
LaFourche County, Orleans Territory
Natchitoches County, Orleans Territory
Opelousas County, Orleans Territory
Orleans County, Orleans Territory
Ouachita County, Orleans Territory
Pointe Coupée County, Orleans Territory
Rapides County, Orleans Territory

Former parishes
Biloxi Parish formed in 1811 from West Florida territory. It was eliminated in 1812 when part of the former West Florida area was transferred to Mississippi Territory.
Carroll Parish formed in 1838 from part of Ouachita Parish. In 1877, it was divided into East Carroll Parish and West Carroll Parish.
Feliciana Parish formed in 1810 from West Florida territory. In 1824, it was divided into East Feliciana Parish and West Feliciana Parish.
Pascagoula Parish formed in 1811 from West Florida territory. It was eliminated in 1812 when part of the former West Florida area was transferred to Mississippi Territory.
Warren Parish formed in 1811 from part of Concordia Parish, and merged into Concordia Parish and Ouachita Parish in 1814.

Maine
 Cornwall County, Province of New York, established 1665, transferred to the Dominion of New England in 1686; to the Province of Massachusetts Bay in 1692 and absorbed into York County (see below).
 Devonshire County, Massachusetts Bay Colony (1674–1675)

Counties organized by Massachusetts in the future State of Maine
The following counties of Massachusetts were organized by the 1780 constitution into the District of Maine, which became a state in 1820:
 York County, Massachusetts, created 1652 as "Yorkshire County" and renamed "York County" in 1668
 Lincoln County, Massachusetts, created 1760
 Cumberland County, Massachusetts, created 1761
 Hancock County, Massachusetts, created 1790
 Washington County, Massachusetts, created 1790
 Kennebec County, Massachusetts, created 1799
 Oxford County, Massachusetts, created 1805
 Somerset County, Massachusetts, created 1809
 Penobscot County, Massachusetts, created 1817

See also Massachusetts, below.

Maryland
 Charles County:  formed in 1650 from part of Saint Mary's County. Abolished in 1654. Referred to as Old Charles County.
 Durham County:  formed in 1669 from part of Somerset County and nonorganized territory. Abolished in 1672 and incorporated in Worcester County. Originally also included portions of Maryland's claim to Delaware.
 Worcester County:  formed in 1672 from part of Durham County and nonorganized territory. Lost in 1685 when Delaware Colony was established.

Massachusetts

Former counties of the colonial era
 Norfolk County, Massachusetts Bay Colony, an original county of the Massachusetts Bay Colony, established 1643; divided in 1680 between Essex County and the newly formed Province of New Hampshire; no connection with the Norfolk County organized in 1793
 Devonshire County, Massachusetts Bay Colony (1674–1675)

Counties transferred from other colonies
 Cornwall County, Province of New York, transferred to Massachusetts in 1686
 Dukes County, Province of New York, transferred to Massachusetts in 1691

Counties organized by Massachusetts in the future State of Maine
The following counties of Massachusetts were organized by the 1780 constitution into the District of Maine, which became a state in 1820:
 York County, Massachusetts, created 1652 as "Yorkshire County" and renamed "York County" in 1668
 Lincoln County, Massachusetts, created 1760
 Cumberland County, Massachusetts, created 1761
 Hancock County, Massachusetts, created 1790
 Washington County, Massachusetts, created 1790
 Kennebec County, Massachusetts, created 1799
 Oxford County, Massachusetts, created 1805
 Somerset County, Massachusetts, created 1809
 Penobscot County, Massachusetts, created 1817

Michigan

Revolutionary era
 Illinois County, Virginia, formed 1778 in support of Virginia's claim to present-day Illinois, Indiana, Michigan, Ohio, Wisconsin and eastern Minnesota; abolished 5 January 1782; territory ceded by Virginia to Congress in March 1784. Throughout this time, Detroit and Fort St. Joseph (present-day Niles, Michigan) were occupied by British forces, and Virginia's jurisdiction in the region was therefore limited to the French settlements of Cahokia, Kaskaskia and Vincennes, far to the south of Michigan.

Former counties of the Northwest, Indiana and Illinois territories
 Wayne County, Northwest Territory, proclaimed on August 15, 1796 following the British evacuation of Detroit; out of portions of Hamilton County, Northwest Territory and unorganized land. This first Wayne County originally encompassed all of Michigan's Lower Peninsula, including northwestern Ohio, northern Indiana, and a small portion of the present Lake Michigan shoreline of Illinois, the site of present-day Chicago. In 1800, the area west of the extension of the present Indiana–Ohio border became part of Knox County, Indiana Territory, and a section in the east of the county's Ohio lands was included as part of the new Trumbull County. This first Wayne County was split upon Ohio's achievement of statehood in 1803; north of the Ordinance Line became part of Indiana Territory as a reorganized Wayne County; the county's remaining lands in Ohio briefly reverted to an unorganized status.
 Wayne County, Indiana Territory, established 1803 as a revival of the former county government, and included in Michigan Territory upon its creation in 1805.
 Knox County, Indiana Territory, established as Knox County, Northwest Territory in 1790; upon the organization of Indiana Territory, Knox County was enlarged to take in  the western side of the Lower Peninsula and a large slice of the Upper Peninsula. It is unknown if Knox County ever exercised jurisdiction over its lands in the future Michigan.
 St. Clair County, Indiana Territory, established as St. Clair County, Northwest Territory in 1790; upon the organization of Indiana Territory, St. Clair County was enlarged to take in the western portion of the Upper Peninsula. When Illinois Territory was set off from the Indiana Territory in 1809, St. Clair County was included in the new government. It can be presumed that this St. Clair County never exercised jurisdiction over its share of the future Michigan, due to the lack of non-native settlers.

Other counties organized by the Illinois Territory between 1809 and 1819, including Madison, Crawford, Bond, and Edwards, notionally included parts of the future Michigan and Wisconsin territories in their boundaries, but do not appear to have exercised jurisdiction north of the current state line.

Former districts of Michigan Territory
The first governor of Michigan Territory, William Hull, declared a county government into existence shortly after assuming power in 1805, but on the same day, ordered that four districts be organized:
 District of Detroit, the area surrounding the settlement at Detroit; in practice, this district was combined with the Huron district.
 District of Erie, the area south of the Huron River and centered on present-day Monroe
 District of Huron, the area north of Detroit, encompassing today's Thumb (Michigan) and Mid-Michigan
 District of Michilimackinac, centered on the Straits of Mackinac and covering the northern half of the Lower Peninsula

Judicial acts and militia organization took place at the district level; the vestigial county government was never organized. District government lapsed after the British occupation of Detroit and Mackinac in 1812; following the recapture of Detroit in 1813, Hull's replacement as governor (by American reckoning), Lewis Cass, abolished the district scheme. In 1815, the current Wayne County was organized; the county government traces its lineage to the 1796 county of that name.

Former counties of Michigan Territory
 Brown County, Michigan Territory, organized 1818, transferred to Wisconsin Territory in 1836, now Brown County, Wisconsin
 Crawford County, Michigan Territory, organized 1818, transferred to Wisconsin Territory in 1836, now Crawford County, Wisconsin
 Des Moines County, Michigan Territory, organized 1834, transferred to Wisconsin Territory in 1836 and Iowa Territory in 1838, now Des Moines County, Iowa
 Dubuque County, Michigan Territory, organized 1834, transferred to Wisconsin Territory in 1836 and Iowa Territory in 1838, now Dubuque County, Iowa
 Iowa County, Michigan Territory, organized 1829, transferred to Wisconsin Territory in 1836, now Iowa County, Wisconsin
 Milwaukee County, Michigan Territory, organized 1835, transferred to Wisconsin Territory in 1836, now Milwaukee County, Wisconsin

Former counties of the State of Michigan
 Isle Royale County, Michigan, abolished in 1897, assigned to Keweenaw County, Michigan
 Manitou County, Michigan, abolished in 1895, divided between Charlevoix and Leelanau counties
 Washington County, Michigan, formed in 1867 from Marquette County, Michigan but declared unconstitutional

Minnesota
 Manomin County, Minnesota (1857–1858) disorganized and shifted between three counties it became part of Anoka County in 1869–1870
 Monongalia County, Minnesota (1861–1870) merged with Kandiyohi County
 Pembina County, Minnesota Territory (1849–1858, reconstituted as Pembina County, Dakota Territory in 1861, eventually reduced to present-day Pembina County, North Dakota.)

Mississippi
 Bourbon County, Georgia (organized by Georgia in 1785 out of disputed Yazoo lands in present-day Mississippi; dissolved in 1788)
 Pearl County, Mississippi (1872–1878), later reformed as Pearl River County in 1890

Three Alabama counties were established in the Mississippi Territory that preceded the two states: Baldwin County, Alabama; Madison County, Alabama; Washington County, Alabama.

Missouri
 Clark County, Missouri (1818–1819) (Not the same as the current Clark County, Missouri)
 Dodge County, Missouri (1849–1853)
 Hempstead County, Missouri (1818–1819)
 Lillard County, Missouri (1821–1825)

Montana
 Edgerton County, Montana, created by the Territorial Legislature in 1865, renamed Lewis and Clark County in 1867

Nevada
 Bullfrog County, Nevada, created from a small portion of Nye County, Nevada in 1987, reabsorbed in 1989. The county had zero population and was intended to ensure that if the Federal government sited a nuclear waste depository there, any revenue would go to the state rather than to Nye County.
 Ormsby County, Nevada, now independent city of Carson City
 Pautah County, California – created by the California legislature out of territory the state believed would be ceded to it north of Lake Tahoe, but which was given to Nevada. County never officially organized.
 Roop County, Nevada – Portions west of 120°W became Lassen County, California, remainder annexed by Washoe County, Nevada in 1883.  Also known as Lake County.

New Hampshire
 Norfolk County, Massachusetts Colony (1643–1679) – became Essex County, Massachusetts and the entire state of New Hampshire.

New Mexico
 Santa Ana County, New Mexico Territory (1844–1876) absorbed by Bernalillo County

New York

 Charlotte County, Province of New York (renamed and partitioned). See Washington County, New York.
 Cornwall County, Province of New York (transferred to Massachusetts in 1686).
 Cumberland County, Province of New York (claimed by and transferred to Vermont, unclear if ever implemented or administered). See Albany County, New York.
 Dukes County, Province of New York (transferred to Massachusetts in 1691).
 Gloucester County, New York (claimed by and transferred to Vermont, unclear if ever implemented or administered).
 Tryon County, New York (renamed and partitioned). See also: Montgomery County, New York
 Yorkshire County, Province of New York (original English county, partitioned in 1683 into Kings, Queens (including modern Nassau), Suffolk, Richmond and Westchester (including modern Bronx) counties.)

North Carolina

Counties formed by the colonial government
 Albemarle County, North Carolina, created 1664, abolished 1739
 Bath County, North Carolina, created 1696, abolished 1739
 Dobbs County, North Carolina, created 1758, effective 1759; lost territory to Wayne County in 1779, remainder of county divided in 1791 between Glasgow (see below) and Lenoir counties
 Bute County, North Carolina, created 1764, divided in 1779 into Franklin and Warren counties
 Tryon County, North Carolina created 1768, effective 1769; divided in 1779 into Lincoln and Rutherford counties

Counties transferred to Federal jurisdiction, 1790
Seven counties were established by the State of North Carolina in its western territories following independence; the entire overmountain  area (the former Washington District), was transferred to Federal jurisdiction in 1790 and formed into the Territory South of the River Ohio. The so-called Southwest Territory would achieve statehood in 1796, as Tennessee.
 Washington County, North Carolina, established 1777 (not to be confused with the present-day Washington County, NC, which was created in 1799 from Tyrrell County, though both counties are named for the same person).
 Sullivan County, North Carolina, established 1779
 Davidson County, North Carolina, established 1783 (not to be confused with the present-day Davidson County, NC, which was created in 1822 from Rowan County, though both counties are named for the same person).
 Greene County, North Carolina, established 1783 (not to be confused with the present-day Greene County, NC, which was created in 1791 from Dobbs County, though both counties are named for the same person).
 Hawkins County, North Carolina, established 1786
 Sumner County, North Carolina, established 1786
 Tennessee County, established 1788, divided at Tennessee statehood in 1796 into Montgomery County, Tennessee and Robertson County, Tennessee

Renamed counties
 Glasgow County, North Carolina – renamed Greene County in 1798.

North Dakota
 Pembina County, Minnesota Territory (1849–1858, reconstituted as Pembina County, Dakota Territory in 1861, eventually reduced to present-day Pembina County, North Dakota.)
 Wallace County, North Dakota (1883–1889 under Dakota Territory, 1889–1896, 1901–1905 under North Dakota, created from Howard County, Dakota Territory, extinct in 1896 from Billings and Stark counties, recreated in 1901 but again absorbed into McKenzie county in 1905.)

Ohio
 Illinois County, Virginia, formed in 1778 and constituted most of present-day Illinois, Indiana, Michigan, Ohio, and Wisconsin; abolished 5 January 1782; territory ceded by Virginia to Congress in March 1784; see Illinois Country.

Oklahoma
 Swanson County, Oklahoma (1910–1911)

Indian Territory

Chickasaw Nation
Tishomingo County
Pontotoc County
Pickens County
Ponola County

Choctaw Nation
Apukshunnubbee District:
Bok Tuklo County
Cedar County
Eagle County
Nashoba County
Red River County
Towson County
Wade County
Moshulatubbee District
Gaines County
Sans Bois County
Skullyville County
Sugar Loaf County
Tobucksy County
Pushmataha District
Atoka County
Blue County
Jack's Fork County
Jackson County
Kiamitia County (Kiamichi County)

Oklahoma Territory
 Beaver County, Oklahoma Territory
 Day County, Oklahoma Territory Abolished at Oklahoma statehood. Split into Roger Mills County and Ellis County
 Greer County, Texas (1888–1895,  transferred to Oklahoma Territory under a Supreme Court decision)

Oregon
 Umpqua County, Oregon created 1851, gradually reduced in size until 1862, when what remained was incorporated into Douglas County
 Champooik or Champoeg County, one of the four original districts into which the Oregon Country was divided in 1843; Renamed Marion County in 1849.
 Twality, Tuality or Falatine County, one of the four original districts into which the Oregon Country was divided in 1843; Renamed Washington County in 1849.

Pennsylvania
 Ontario County (1810–1812) renamed as Bradford County.

South Carolina
Note: South Carolina legally dissolved all overarching "districts" (which often included multiple counties) in 1800. Nevertheless, surviving counties were often referred to incorrectly as "districts" as late as the 1860s.
Bartholomew County created in 1785 from Charleston District. Abolished 1791.
Beaufort District created in 1768 from Granville County. Abolished 1800.
Berkeley (1) County created in 1682 from Craven County. Abolished 1768.
Berkeley (2) County created in 1785 from Charleston District. Abolished 1791. The third version of Berkeley County was created in 1882 and remains today.
Camden District created in 1768 from Craven County. Abolished 1800.
Carteret County created in 1684 from Colleton County. Abolished 1708.
Charles Town District created in 1768 from Berkeley and Colleton Counties. It was renamed Charleston District in 1785, and abolished in 1800.
Charleston (1) County created in 1785 from Charleston District. Abolished 1791. A second Charleston County was created in 1800 and remains today.
Cheraws District created in 1768 from Craven County. Abolished 1800.
Claremont County created in 1785 from Camden County. Abolished 1800.
Clarendon (1) County created in 1785 from Camden County. Its county seat was in Jamesville. Abolished 1800. Clarendon (2) County was reestablished in 1855 with its county seat in Manning and remains today.
Colleton (1) County created in 1682 from Craven County. Abolished 1768.
Colleton (2) County created in 1785 from Charleston District. Abolished 1791. A third Colleton County was created in 1800 from Charleston District and remains today.
Craven County was part of Carolina's first charter in 1664. Abolished 1768.
Georgetown District created in 1768 from Craven County. Abolished 1800.
Granville (1) County created in 1708 from Carteret County. Abolished 1768.
Granville (2) County created in 1785 from Beaufort District. Abolished 1791.
Hilton County created in 1785 from Beaufort District. Abolished 1791.
Kingston County created in 1785 from Georgetown District. Abolished 1801.
Lewisburg County created in 1785 from Orangeburg District. Abolished 1791.
Lexington (1) County created in 1785 from Orangeburg District. Abolished 1791. Lexington (2) County was reestablished in 1804 from Orangeburg County and remains today.
Liberty County created in 1785 from Georgetown District. Abolished 1798.
Lincoln County created in 1785 from Beaufort District. Abolished 1791.
Marion County created in 1785 from Charleston District. Abolished 1791.
Ninety-six District created in 1768 from Indian lands. Abolished 1800.
Orangeburgh District created in 1768 from Orangeburgh Township and Amelia Township. Spelling officially changed to Orangeburg District in 1783. Abolished 1800.
Orange County created in 1785 from Orangeburg District. Abolished 1791. (Note: Orangeburg County was created in 1791 from Orangeburg District and remains today.)
Pendleton County was created in 1789 from Cherokee Indian lands. It was joined to the overarching Washington District in 1791 along with Greenville County. In 1798 Washington District was renamed Pendleton District an overarching district including Pendleton County and Greenville County. In 1800 South Carolina abolished all the overarching districts. So in 1800 only the separate Pendleton County and Greenville County emerged. The remaining Pendleton County was abolished in 1826.
Pendleton District was created in 1798 by renaming Washington District. This overarching Pendleton District was dissolved two years later in 1800. However Pendleton County remained and emerged from a part of Pendleton District. Pendleton County was abolished 1826.
Pinckney District created in 1791 from Ninety-six District and Cheraws District. Abolished 1800.
Salem County created in 1792 from Claremont County and Clarendon County. Abolished 1800.
Shrewsbury County created in 1785 from Beaufort District. Abolished 1791.
Spartan County created in 1785 from Ninety-six District. Changed to Spartanburg County in 1791 and remains today.
Washington County created in 1785 from Charleston District. Abolished 1791.
Washington District created in 1791 from Cherokee Indian lands. Washington District included Greenville County (created 1786) and Pendleton County (created 1789) Washington District was renamed in 1798 to Pendleton District.
Winton County created in 1785 from Orangeburg District. Abolished 1791.
Winyah County created in 1785 from Georgetown District. Abolished 1800.

South Dakota
 Armstrong County, South Dakota, created as Pyatt County in 1883, renamed to Armstrong in 1895, and merged into Dewey County in 1953.
 Lugenbeel County (1875-1909), divided and merged into Bennett County and Todd County.
 Shannon County, South Dakota (1875–2015) renamed Oglala Lakota County by referendum in 2014.
 Washabaugh County, South Dakota (1889–1979) The eastern part of the Pine Ridge Indian Reservation is now under the control of Jackson County.
 Washington County, South Dakota, a former county (1883–1943) that was divided and then merged into Jackson County, Pennington County and Shannon County in 1943 because of financial troubles in South Dakota

Tennessee
 James County, Tennessee (1870–1919) – Now part of Hamilton County and Bradley County. The county seat was Ooltewah.
 Tennessee County, North Carolina (1788–1796) – A North Carolina county that was divided and renamed Montgomery County and Robertson County when Tennessee achieved statehood to lessen confusion.  These counties still exist but were eventually subdivided further.

Texas
 Buchanan County (1858–1861), renamed to Stephens County
 Buchel County (1887–1897, formed from part of Presidio County, absorbed by Brewster County)
 Dawson County (defunct), Texas (1858–1866, became parts of Uvalde and Kinney counties; not to be confused with present-day Dawson County)
 Davis County (1861–1871), reverted to previously named Cass County
 Encinal County (1856–1899, absorbed by Webb County)
 Foley County (1887–1897, formed from part of Presidio County, absorbed by Brewster County)
 Greer County (1888–1895,  transferred to Oklahoma Territory under a Supreme Court decision)
 Harrisburg County (1836–1839), renamed to Harris County
 Miller County, Arkansas Territory (1820–1825, became part of Indian Territory and present-day Texas)
 Mina County (1834-1837), renamed to Bastrop County.
 Navasota County (1841–1842), renamed to Brazos County
 Santa Fe County (1848–1850, abolished November 25, 1850; land ceded to United States in compliance with Compromise of 1850)
 Tenehaw County (1835-1836) renamed to Shelby County.
 Wegefarth County (1873–1876, abolished by Texas Legislature)
 Worth County (1850, formed from part of Santa Fe County, abolished November 25, 1850; land ceded to United States in compliance with Compromise of 1850)

Utah
In 1849 most Great Basin settlers asked for admission to the Union as the State of Deseret. In 1850 Congress responded by reducing her size and organizing Utah Territory. In 1896 Utah became a state.
 Carson County, Utah Territory created 1854 from parts of Weber, Desert, Tooele, Juab, Millard, Iron counties. In 1861 Nevada Territory took jurisdiction and Carson County was extinguished. Nevada erected Carson City (Independent City), Douglas, Lake, Lyon, Ormsby, Roop, Storey, Washoe, and parts of Churchill, Esmeralda, Humboldt, Mineral, Nye, and Pershing counties from her land.
 Cedar County, Utah Territory created 1856 from part of Utah County. Discontinued 1862; her land parted into Tooele County and Utah County.
 Desert County, Utah Territory created 1852 extending from Salt Lake to California. Reduced in 1856, extinguished 1862; her land parted into Box Elder and Tooele counties.
 Greasewood County, Utah Territory created 1856 from part of Weber County. Discontinued 1862 and her land given to Box Elder County.
 Great Salt Lake County, Utah Territory created 1850; expanded 1852 to Colorado border; reduced 1856; in 1866 reduced again to her present borders and name changed to Salt Lake County.
 Green River County, Utah Territory created 1852 included big parts of present-day Colorado and Wyoming. Summit County carved out 1854; in 1856 Malad, Box Elder, and Cache counties peeled off, but Green River County expanded into Salt Lake, Utah, and Sanpete counties; 1861 parts of Colorado and Wyoming shaved off; 1862 Morgan and Wasatch counties trimmed off; 1864 Rich County sliced out; 1868 last part of Wyoming cut out; 1872 Green River County was dissolved, and her land ceded to Summit County.
 Humboldt County, Utah Territory formed 1856 from Weber, Desert, Tooele, and Juab counties. Nevada took jurisdiction in 1861 forming her own Humboldt County, Nevada to the northeast. On the former Humboldt County's land, Nevada formed parts of her own Humboldt, Churchill, Elko, Eureka, Lander, and Pershing counties.
 Little Salt Lake County, Utah Territory created 1850 with undefined boundaries on unsettled land. In 1852 the legislature redefined the area as Iron County.
 Malad County, Utah Territory created 1856 from part of Weber County. Discontinued 1862, her land ceded to Box Elder County.
 Richland County, Utah Territory formed 1864 from parts of Cache, Summit, and Green River counties. In 1868 part was given to Wyoming and the rest renamed Rich County.
 Rio Virgen County, Utah Territory created 1869 from Washington County. Discontinued 1872 after a survey showed most of it was in Nevada and Arizona Territory.
 Saint Mary's County, Utah Territory formed 1856 from parts of Weber, Desert, Tooele, and Juab counties. In 1861 Nevada Territory took jurisdiction and Saint Mary's ended. On Saint Mary's land, Nevada created parts of Elko, Eureka, and White Pine counties.
 Shambip County, Utah Territory created 1856 from part of Tooele County. Discontinued 1862 and her land reverted to Tooele County.

Vermont
 Cumberland County, Republic of Vermont (1771–1781)
 Cumberland County, Province of New York (claimed by and transferred to Vermont, unclear if ever implemented or administered). See Albany County, New York.
 Gloucester County, New York (claimed by and transferred to Vermont, unclear if ever implemented or administered).
 Washington County, Republic of Vermont (1781–1782) land now in New Hampshire; Vermont relinquished claim; there is a present-day "new" Washington County, Vermont

Virginia

 Alexandria County, D.C. (retroceded to Virginia, most of which now comprises Arlington County, Virginia with a portion becoming part of Alexandria, Virginia)
 Elizabeth City County, Virginia (incorporated into the independent city of Hampton in 1952)
 Fincastle County, Virginia (land now part of Kentucky)
 Illinois County, Virginia, formed in 1778 and constituted most of present-day Ohio, Indiana, Illinois, Michigan, and Wisconsin; abolished 5 January 1782; territory ceded by Virginia to Congress in March 1784.
 Kentucky County, Virginia (1777–1780) land that later became the state of Kentucky in 1792
 Lower Norfolk County (Colonial Virginia) (in 1691, divided into Norfolk County, Virginia and Princess Anne County, Virginia)
 Nansemond County, Virginia became independent city of Nansemond in 1972; merged with independent city of Suffolk in 1974
 New Norfolk County (Colonial Virginia) Formed in 1636 from Elizabeth River Shire, divided into Lower Norfolk County and Upper Norfolk County in 1637
 Norfolk County, Virginia Formed in 1691 from part of Lower Norfolk County, was merged with independent city of South Norfolk to become new independent city of Chesapeake in 1963
 Old Rappahannock County  (Province of Virginia) Founded in 1656 from part of Lancaster County and became extinct in 1692 when it was separated to form Essex County and Richmond County
 Princess Anne County, Virginia (Formed in 1691 from part of Lower Norfolk County, was merged with independent city of Virginia Beach in 1963)
 Upper Norfolk County (Colonial Virginia) (renamed Nansemond County in 1642; see Nansemond County for subsequent history)
 Warwick River County, Virginia (renamed Warwick County in 1642; became independent city of Warwick in 1952; merged with  independent city of Newport News in 1958)
 Yohogania County, Virginia (1776–1779) land now in Pennsylvania and West Virginia

Washington
 Chehalis County (1854-1915) renamed as Grays Harbor County.
 Quillehuyte County (1868-1869) merged back into Clallam County and Jefferson County.
 Sawamish County (1854-1864) renamed as Mason County.
 Slaughter County (1857) renamed as Kitsap County.

West Virginia
See Virginia & Virginia Colony, above

Wisconsin

Revolutionary-era claims of Virginia
 Illinois County, Virginia, formed in 1778 and constituting Virginia's claimed lands in present-day Illinois, Indiana, Michigan, Ohio, and Wisconsin; abolished 5 January 1782; territory ceded by Virginia to Congress in March 1784; see Illinois Country and Northwest Territory. Wisconsin's non-native settlements of this era were peopled by British and Canadian fur traders, and it is unclear if Virginia ever attempted to exercise its jurisdiction in today's Wisconsin.

Counties of Wisconsin created by Michigan Territory
 Brown County, Michigan Territory, 1818; see Brown County, Wisconsin
 Crawford County, Michigan Territory, 1818; see Crawford County, Wisconsin
 Iowa County, Michigan Territory, 1829; see Iowa County, Wisconsin
 Milwaukee County, Michigan Territory, 1835; see Milwaukee County, Wisconsin

Counties of Iowa created by Michigan Territory and transferred to Wisconsin Territory
 Des Moines County, Michigan Territory, 1834; see Des Moines County, Iowa
 Dubuque County, Michigan Territory, 1834; see Dubuque County, Iowa

Counties of Iowa created by Wisconsin Territory
 Henry County, Wisconsin Territory, 1836; see Henry County, Iowa
 Lee County, Wisconsin Territory, 1836; see Lee County, Iowa
 Louisa County, Wisconsin Territory, 1836; see Louisa County, Iowa
 Muscatine County, Wisconsin Territory, 1836; see Muscatine County, Iowa
 Van Buren County, Wisconsin Territory, 1836; see Van Buren County, Iowa
 Henry County, Wisconsin Territory, 1836; see Henry County, Iowa
 Benton County, Wisconsin Territory, 1837; see Benton County, Iowa
 Buchanan County, Wisconsin Territory, 1837; see Buchanan County, Iowa
 Cedar County, Wisconsin Territory, 1837; see Cedar County, Iowa
 Clayton County, Wisconsin Territory, 1837; see Clayton County, Iowa
 Clinton County, Wisconsin Territory, 1837; see Clinton County, Iowa
 Delaware County, Wisconsin Territory, 1837; see Delaware County, Iowa
 Fayette County, Wisconsin Territory, 1837; see Fayette County, Iowa
 Jackson County, Wisconsin Territory, 1837; see Jackson County, Iowa
 Johnson County, Wisconsin Territory, 1837; see Johnson County, Iowa
 Jones County, Wisconsin Territory, 1837; see Jones County, Iowa
 Keokuk County, Wisconsin Territory, 1837; see Keokuk County, Iowa
 Linn County, Wisconsin Territory, 1836; see Linn County, Iowa
 Scott County, Wisconsin Territory, 1837; see Scott County, Iowa
 Slaughter County, Wisconsin Territory, 1838; see Washington County, Iowa

Counties of Wisconsin divided after statehood
 La Pointe County, Wisconsin, 1848

Wyoming
 Carter County, renamed to Sweetwater County in 1869.
 Pease County, renamed to Johnson County in 1879.

See also

United States of America
Outline of the United States
Index of United States-related articles
Historic regions of the United States

References

External links
 Ghost Counties: Your Guide to America's Dead, Forgotten Counties 
 Atlas of Historical County Boundaries
 Handbook of Texas Online: DEFUNCT COUNTIES
 Iowa's Defunct Counties
 Defunct Kansas Counties
 Ancestry.com: County Boundaries & Boundary Changes
 Formation of South Carolina Counties
 SDGENWEB Extinct County Selection List
 Virginia Counties
 Missing Counties of Virginia
 Extinct Louisiana parishes and counties

 
 
Former
United States counties